Stefan Witorzeńć (2 January 190830 December 1994) DFC was a Polish fighter ace of the Polish Air Force in World War II with 5 confirmed kills and one shared.

Biography
Stefan Witorzeńć was born in 1908 to a noble family. In 1930 he completed the Reserve Officers School of Infantry. In 1932 he was graduated from the Polish Air Force Academy. He served in the 3rd Aviation Regiment in Poznań, then he was an instructor in the Higher Pilot School in Grudziądz.

In the September Campaign he defended the region of Dęblin. He was evacuated to the UK via Romania and France. On 6 August 1940 he was ordered to the No. 501 Squadron RAF where flew with Stanisław Skalski. During the Battle of Britain Witorzeńć scored 4 victories and one shared. On 18 August he shot down the German ace Horst Tietzen. On 17 November 1940 he was transferred to the No. 306 Polish Fighter Squadron and 5 days after he took command of the A flight. In March 1941 he was promoted captain. On 14 May 1941 he was posted to the No. 302 Polish Fighter Squadron, on 27 May he became commander of his squadron. On 24 November 1941 he was given command of the No. 133 Wing RAF. On 1 June 1942 he received the Distinguished Flying Cross. From 25 September 1942 to 24 April 1944 he was the liaison officer, then he became the training director of the No.61 OTU. From August 1944 he served in command of the No. 133 Wing RAF at the same time he realized combat missions.

On 7 January 1945 Witorzeńć became commander of the No. 25 (Polish) Elementary Flying Training School (EFTS). He came back to Poland in 1948 but it was only in 1957, after the end of Stalinism, he was allowed to join the Polish People's Army Air Force. He served in the Air Force Command then he was given command of the Air Training Centre in Modlin. In 1968 he went into the reserve. In 1991 he became president of the Polish Air Force Association.

Stefan Witorzeńć died on 30 December 1994. He is buried at the Powązki Cemetery

Aerial victory credits
 Bf 110 - 12 August 1940 (damaged)
 2 x Ju 87 – 15 August 1940
 Bf 109 – 18 August 1940
 Ju 88 - 24 August 1940 (damaged)
 Do 215 – 2 September 1940
  Do 215 – 11 September 1940
 Bf 109 – 4 September 1941

Awards
 Virtuti Militari, Silver Cross 
 Cross of Valour (Poland)
 Distinguished Flying Cross (United Kingdom)
 Commander's Cross with Star of Polonia Restituta

References

Further reading
 Stefan Czmur, Z żałobnej karty. Płk pil. Stefan Witorzeńć (1908-1994), Wojskowy Przegląd Historyczny, Warsaw 1995, nr 1/2 (151/152), p. 322-324.
 Tadeusz Jerzy Krzystek, Anna Krzystek: Polskie Siły Powietrzne w Wielkiej Brytanii w latach 1940-1947 łącznie z Pomocniczą Lotniczą Służbą Kobiet (PLSK-WAAF). Sandomierz: Stratus, 2012, p. 613. 
 Jerzy Pawlak: Absolwenci Szkoły Orląt: 1925-1939. Warszawa: Retro-Art, 2009, p. 118. 
 Piotr Sikora: Asy polskiego lotnictwa. Warszawa: Oficyna Wydawnicza Alma-Press. 2014, p. 333-337. 
 Józef Zieliński: Asy polskiego lotnictwa. Warszawa: Agencja lotnicza ALTAIR, 1994, p. 62-63. 
 Józef Zieliński: Lotnicy polscy w Bitwie o Wielką Brytanię. Warszawa: Oficyna Wydawnicza MH, 2005, p. 215-216. 
 Лідскія юбіляры 2008 года // Лідскі летапісец, No. 41, 42.

External links
 

The Few
Polish World War II flying aces
Recipients of the Silver Cross of the Virtuti Militari
Recipients of the Cross of Valour (Poland)
Commanders with Star of the Order of Polonia Restituta
1994 deaths
1908 births
Burials at Powązki Cemetery